Birgerius is a monotypic genus of European dwarf spiders containing the single species, Birgerius microps. It was first described by Michael I. Saaristo in 1973, and has only been found in France and Spain.

See also
 List of Linyphiidae species

References

Linyphiidae
Monotypic Araneomorphae genera
Taxa named by Michael Saaristo